A Man Called Ove is a novel by Swedish writer Fredrik Backman published in Swedish by Forum in 2012. The novel was published in English in 2013 and reached the New York Times Best Seller list 18 months after its publication and stayed on the list for 42 weeks.

It has been adapted into two films: A Man Called Ove, which premiered in Sweden on 25 December 2015, with Rolf Lassgård in the leading role, and A Man Called Otto, released on 30 December 2022, with Tom Hanks in the leading role.

Inspiration 
Backman got his inspiration for this book after reading an article about a man named Ove who had a fit while buying tickets at an art museum. Backman instantly related to this man as he claims to be "not great at talking to people". He started writing blogposts under the heading, "I am a Man Called Ove", where he wrote about his pet peeves and annoyances. Eventually, he realized that his writing had potential for the creation of an interesting fictional character.

Plot summary
"Ove is a curmudgeon—the kind of man who points at people he dislikes as if they were burglars caught outside his bedroom window. He has staunch principles, strict routines, and a short fuse. People call him 'the bitter neighbour from hell.' However, behind the cranky exterior there is a story and a sadness. So when one November morning a chatty young couple with two chatty young daughters move in next door and accidentally flatten Ove's mailbox, it is the lead-in to a comical and heart-warming tale of unkempt cats, unexpected friendship, and the ancient art of backing up a U-Haul. All of which will change one cranky old man and a local residents' association to their very foundations."

–promotional blurb on U.S. edition cover jacket

Characters
 Ove — A grumpy, 59-year-old widower who has recently been forced to retire
 Sonja — Ove's deceased wife
 Parvaneh — Ove's neighbour, a pregnant woman of Iranian descent, and a mother of two
 Patrick — Parvaneh's husband
 Rune — Ove's former friend who has become a nemesis and neighbour, he now has Alzheimer's 
 Anita — Rune's wife
 Adrian — The neighbourhood mailman 
 Jimmy — The overweight neighbour

Reception 
Overall, A Man Called Ove was received well, with the review aggregator website, Bookmarks, giving the book a "rave" review. Kirkus Reviews gave a positive review of the novel, describing how, "the back story chapters have a simple, fablelike quality, while the current-day chapters are episodic and, at times, hysterically funny. In both instances, the narration can veer toward the preachy or overly pat, but wry descriptions, excellent pacing and the juxtaposition of Ove's attitude with his deeds add plenty of punch to balance out any pathos." Publishers Weekly called the novel "a fuzzy crowd-pleaser that serves up laughs to accompany a thoughtful reflection on loss and love. Though Ove's antics occasionally feel repetitive, the author writes with winning charm."

Adaptations

Film
The novel was adapted into A Man Called Ove, a Swedish film released on 25 December 2015, written and directed by Hannes Holm and starring Rolf Lassgård as Ove. The film was nominated for six awards, winning two, at the 51st Guldbagge Awards in 2016. It was nominated for the Best Foreign Language Film and Best Makeup and Hairstyling categories at the 89th Academy Awards.

An English-language film adaptation called A Man Called Otto was also released, with Tom Hanks starring and producing.

Theatre
In January 2015, a stage version of the book, starring Johan Rheborg in the leading role as Ove, premiered in Stockholm.

Audiobook 
In July 2014, Dreamscape Media released an audiobook version of this book, read in English by the American actor George Newbern.

References

External links
 Fredrik Backman's Website
 

2012 Swedish novels
Novels set in Sweden
Swedish novels adapted into films
Swedish-language novels
Swedish novels adapted into plays
Novels by Fredrik Backman
2012 debut novels
Bokförlaget Forum books
Atria Publishing Group books